Joseph James is the name of two Kansa-Osage-French interpreters on the Kansas and Indian Territory frontier in the 19th century. Both were usually called "Joe Jim" or "Jojim".

Joe Jim
Joe Jim Sr. was probably born in the 1790s at the Osage town in Vernon County, Missouri. He was probably the son of a French trader and an Osage woman. By about 1815, Joe Jim was living among the Kaw tribe along the Kansas River in what would become the state of Kansas. Joe Jim married Wyhesee (b.  1802), a daughter of Kaw chieftain White Plume, and thereafter became an important member of the tribe. Joe Jim was a signatory to an 1825 treaty ceding Kaw land to the United States government under the name of Ky-he-ga-shin-ga (Little Chief).

Fluent in English, French, Kaw (Kanza), and Osage (nearly identical with Kaw); he became an interpreter for the U.S. government about 1829. In 1830, he served as a guide for a surveying expedition to western Kansas by missionary Isaac McCoy. McCoy, critical of most of his associates, was laudatory of Joe Jim. The last record of Joe Jim
is 1837, when he was still employed by the U.S. government as an interpreter.
Joseph James is listed in the 1843 census of the Kaw, but whether this refers to Joe Jim Sr. or Joe Jim Jr. is unclear.

Joe Jim Jr.
Joe Jim Jr. was born about 1820 and his place of birth was given as "Big Bottom", a place along the Kansas River. (Joe Jim Jr.'s birth date on his tombstone is given as 1814, but that date is inconsistent with other statements concerning his age.) He was apparently illiterate. In 1846 and 1847, during the Mexican–American War, Peter Revard, a mixed blood Osage, and he drove a herd of cattle from Kansas to New Mexico to feed American soldiers. He worked as a teamster during a military campaign against the Navajos. While returning to Kansas in a wagon train, he survived a Comanche attack that resulted in the death of two American soldiers.

In the 1850s, Joe Jim had an arm amputated due to "poisoning", which ended his active life. He became an interpreter for the U.S. government in 1858, and thereafter was a principal point of contact between Whites and the Kaw tribe, living in both worlds and not accepted fully in either. One of the Indian agents for whom Joe Jim worked was Hiram Warner Farnsworth. In 1859, he was an informant for pioneering ethnologist Lewis Henry Morgan. Morgan said of him,  Joe Jim’s wife was Margaret Curley, a full-blooded Potawatomi Indian. The Potawatomi had been forced by the U.S. to move to Kansas from the Ohio River valley in the 1830s.

Joe Jim has been credited with naming Topeka, Kansas. Asked by White settlers what the name of the place was, he answered, "Topeka", stating that it meant "a good place to grow potatoes", probably meaning the prairie turnip rather than the common potato. In 1867, Joe Jim accompanied a Kaw delegation headed by Chief Al-le-ga-wa-ho to Washington. The Kaw were disappearing rapidly as a tribe, their lands being occupied by White settlers. They sought a new reservation free of white squatters in the Indian Territory (later Oklahoma).

Joe Jim was involved in one of the most colorful and public Indian battles in the West. On June 1, 1868, about 100 Cheyenne warriors descended upon the Kaw reservation near Council Grove, Kansas. The Kaw men sallied forth to meet them, and for four hours, the tribes staged a military pageant described as a "battle royal". The Cheyenne then retired from the field, taking with them a few stolen horses and a peace offering of coffee and sugar donated by the merchants of Council Grove. Nobody was seriously hurt on either side. During the battle, Joe Jim galloped 60 miles (97 km) on horseback to Topeka to inform the governor that the Cheyenne were attacking and to request assistance. With him on the ride to Topeka was an eight-year-old nephew called "Indian Charley". This was Charles Curtis, who later became Vice President of the United States.

On June 4, 1873, the Kaws, by this time diminished by disease, alcoholism, and warfare, to only 500 people from their earlier population of 1,500, packed their possessions and left for a new reservation in what became Kay County, Oklahoma. Their numbers continued to decline, reaching a low of about 200 in 1890. Joe Jim and his wife Margaret established a homestead on the east bank of the Arkansas River just south of the border with Kansas. He died September 21, 1898, the oldest of the Kaw Indians. He was buried in the Washunga cemetery now located in Newkirk, Oklahoma.

References

Native American leaders
Kaw people
Osage people
American frontier
People of the American Old West